The Louisiana Tech Bulldogs football program is a college football team that represents Louisiana Tech University in Conference USA in the National Collegiate Athletic Association. The team has had 33 head coaches and one interim head coach since it started playing organized football in 1901. The current head coach of the Bulldogs is Sonny Cumbie, who was hired on November 30, 2021. Cumbie previously served as the interim head coach, offensive coordinator and quarterbacks coach at Texas Tech University.

Key

Coaches
Statistics correct as of November 28, 2022.

References

Lists of college football head coaches

Louisiana sports-related lists